Yovkov Point (Yovkov Nos \'yov-kov 'nos\) is a point on the southwest coast of Greenwich Island, Antarctica projecting 150 m southwards into McFarlane Strait, forming the northwest side of the entrance to Kramolin Cove.  Formed as a result of Murgash Glacier's retreat in the late 20th and early 21st century.  The feature is named after the famous Bulgarian writer Yordan Yovkov (1880–1937).

Location

Maps
 L.L. Ivanov et al. Antarctica: Livingston Island and Greenwich Island, South Shetland Islands. Scale 1:100000 topographic map. Sofia: Antarctic Place-names Commission of Bulgaria, 2005.
 L.L. Ivanov. Antarctica: Livingston Island and Greenwich, Robert, Snow and Smith Islands. Scale 1:120000 topographic map.  Troyan: Manfred Wörner Foundation, 2009.

References
 Yovkov Point. SCAR Composite Gazetteer of Antarctica
 Bulgarian Antarctic Gazetteer. Antarctic Place-names Commission. (details in Bulgarian, basic data in English)

External links
 Yovkov Point. Copernix satellite image

Headlands of Greenwich Island
Bulgaria and the Antarctic